Azmahar Aníbal Ariano Navarro (born 14 January 1991 in Panama City, Panama) is a footballer, who currently plays as a centre back for C.D. Plaza Amador.

Club career
Also known as Mello, Ariano played for local clubs Tauro, Sporting San Miguelito and Chepo before joining Hungarian top-tier side Honvéd in March 2014. In January 2012 he was supposed to be loaned to Colombian club Deportivo Tulúa, but the move never materialized.

He returned to Chepo during the 2015 Clausura.

International career
In May 2018, he was named in Panama's preliminary 35 man squad for the 2018 World Cup in Russia. However, he did not make the final 23.

Club statistics

Updated to games played as of 11 November 2014.

Personal life
Ariano married in July 2012.

References

External links

1991 births
Living people
Sportspeople from Panama City
Panamanian footballers
Panama international footballers
Association football defenders
Tauro F.C. players
Unión Deportivo Universitario players
Sporting San Miguelito players
Chepo FC players
Budapest Honvéd FC players
C.D. Árabe Unido players
Atlético Bucaramanga footballers
Patriotas Boyacá footballers
C.D. Marathón players
C.D. Plaza Amador players
Nemzeti Bajnokság I players
Liga Panameña de Fútbol players
Categoría Primera A players
Liga Nacional de Fútbol Profesional de Honduras players
Panamanian expatriate footballers
Expatriate footballers in Hungary
Panamanian expatriate sportspeople in Hungary
Expatriate footballers in Colombia
Panamanian expatriate sportspeople in Colombia
Expatriate footballers in Honduras
Panamanian expatriate sportspeople in Honduras
2017 Copa Centroamericana players